Lely Industries N.V. is a Dutch agricultural machine and robots manufacturer which is based in Maassluis, the Netherlands. It is considered as one of the leading dairy robot manufacturers.

History
The company was founded in 1948 by the Lely brothers, Cornelis van der Lely and Arij van der Lely, in Maassluis.

In 2012, the company acquired Aircon GmbH and subsequently renamed it as Lely Aircon B.V.

At the end of 2016, Lely ceased tipper production in Waldstetten.

In March 2017, the sale of the forage harvesting technology division with the plants in Waldstetten (loader wagons) and Wolfenbüttel (baling presses) to AGCO was announced.

In 2019, the company milking system reached the finals of 2019 European Inventor Award.

Robots
 Lely Astronaut A4
 Lely Vector
 Lely Juno

External links 
Official website

See also
 Automated milking

Reference

Dutch brands
Dutch companies established in 1948
Manufacturing companies established in 1948
Agricultural machinery manufacturers of the Netherlands
Dairy farming equipment manufacturers
Companies based in South Holland
Maassluis